The Gambia competed at the 1996 Summer Olympics in Atlanta, United States.

Results by event

Athletics

Men 

Track and road events

Field events

Women 

Track and road events

References
 Official Olympic Reports

External links
 

Nations at the 1996 Summer Olympics
1996
Oly